The Westgate Building, formerly known as Information Sciences and Technology Building (commonly known as the IST Building) is a classroom building at Pennsylvania State University.  Construction was completed in January 2004.

The building was designed by the acclaimed architect Rafael Vinoly.  According to the Penn State IST website, the design of the building "began as an inkpen sketch on a paper dinner napkin."  He characterizes the building as "a labor of love . . . my own personal obsession for years", stating that, in the beginning, it seemed "crazy and extreme" to construct an S-shaped building over North Atherton Street.  According to the Penn State IST Website, "His firm, Rafael Vinoly Architects, New York, partnered with Perfido Weiskopf Architects, Pittsburgh, for the design inspired by the Ponte Vecchio in Florence." Despite its name, this building currently is the home of both the Pennsylvania State University Computer Science department, in addition to the IST department.

In order to "better represent the building’s many uses", the building was renamed the Westgate Building.

References
Penn State Electrical Engineering and Computer Science Department
Penn State College of Information Sciences and Technology

Notes

Pennsylvania State University